Lac de Saint-Agnan is a lake in Nièvre, France. At an elevation of 560 m, its surface area is 1.4 km².

History
It was inaugurated in 1969. It is the last of the great lakes born from the Morvan dam. The lake was drained in October 2002 and 2008.

Saint Agnan